In Diplomatic Circles is a 1913 American drama film featuring Harry Carey.

Cast
 Walter Miller as The Reporter
 William J. Butler as The Father
 Constance Johnson as The Daughter
 Charles West as The Lover
 Lionel Barrymore as The Japanese Ambassador
 William Courtright as The Secretary of State
 Harry Hyde as The Foreign Agent
 Harry Carey as The Butler
 John T. Dillon as The Detective

See also
 Harry Carey filmography
 Lionel Barrymore filmography

External links

1913 films
1913 drama films
1913 short films
Silent American drama films
American silent short films
American black-and-white films
Films directed by Anthony O'Sullivan
Films with screenplays by Frank E. Woods
1910s American films